The Gulf crayfish snake (Liodytes rigida sinicola) is a subspecies of nonvenomous snake endemic to the southeastern United States.

Description
It averages 20 inches (51 cm) when fully grown, with a record of 31.5 inches (80 cm).  Its color is best described as chocolate brown.

Diet
This subspecies feeds almost entirely on crayfish.

Taxonomy
Close relatives of the Gulf crayfish snake are the glossy crayfish snake (Liodytes rigida rigida) and the Delta crayfish snake (Liodytes rigida deltae).

Further reading
 Huheey, James E. 1959. Distribution and Variation in the Glossy Water Snake, Natrix rigida (Say). Copeia 1959 (4): 303–311. (Natrix rigida sinicola)

External links 

 http://www.flmnh.ufl.edu/natsci/herpetology/fl-guide/Reginarsinicola.htm
 http://www.uga.edu/srelherp/jd/jdweb/Herps/species/USsnakes/Regrigsin.htm
 http://www.zo.utexas.edu/research/txherps/snakes/regina.rigida.html
 http://www.snakesofarkansas.com/Main/ReginaRigida

Reptiles of the United States
Liodytes